Anorrhinus is a genus of hornbills (family Bucerotidae) found in forests of Southeast Asia (just barely extending into adjacent parts of India and China). They are social and typically seen in groups, but only the dominant pair are believed to breed, while other group members act as helpers.

Taxonomy
This genus is sometimes limited to the bushy-crested hornbill, in which case the two remaining species, which are sometimes considered conspecific, are placed in the genus Ptilolaemus. A molecular phylogenetic study published in 2013 found that Anorrhinus was sister to a clade containing the genera Anthracoceros and Ocyceros.

The genus contains three species:

References

 Kemp, A. C. (2001). Family Bucerotidae (Hornbills). pp. 436–523 in: del Hoyo, J., Elliott, A., & Sargatal, J. eds. (2001). Handbook of the Birds of the World. Vol. 6. Mousebirds to Hornbills. Lynx Edicions, Barcelona. 

 
Bird genera
 
Taxa named by Ludwig Reichenbach